Prospect Park is a light rail station on the Green Line in the Prospect Park neighborhood of Minneapolis. It is located in the median of 29th Avenue just south of the University of Minnesota Transitway between 4th Street Southeast and University Avenue. It is the last stop in Minneapolis on the Green Line before Saint Paul.

History
Construction of the rail line along the transitway began in 2011, and station construction beginning in 2012. During planning and early construction the station was known as 29th Avenue. The station opened along with the rest of the line in 2014. 

A bus rapid transit station, University & 29th Avenue, was considered for the E Line, but not pursued due to a too far distance between stations. Instead two stations at 27th Street and Malcolm Avenue were chosen. When operational in 2025 the Green Line and E Line will resemble skip-stop service between Stadium Village and Westgate stations.

Ridership
Ridership at the station has increased significantly after much of the surrounding land use was transformed from industrial to housing.

References

External links
Metro Transit: Prospect Park Station

Metro Green Line (Minnesota) stations in Minneapolis
Railway stations in the United States opened in 2014
2014 establishments in Minnesota